A marker vaccine is a vaccine which allows for immunological differentiation (or segregation) of infected from vaccinated animals, and is also referred to as a DIVA (or SIVA) vaccine [Differentiation (or Segregation) of infected from vaccinated animals] in veterinary medicine. In practical terms, this is most often achieved by omitting an immunogenic antigen present in the pathogen being vaccinated against, thus creating a negative marker of vaccination. In contrast, vaccination with traditional vaccines containing the complete pathogen, either attenuated or inactivated, precludes the use of serology (e.g. analysis of specific antibodies in body fluids) in epidemiological surveys in vaccinated populations.

Apart from the obvious advantage of allowing continued serological monitoring of vaccinated individuals, cohorts or populations; the serological difference between vaccinated individuals and individuals that were exposed to the pathogen, and were contagious, can be used to continuously monitor the efficacy and safety of the vaccine.

References

Animal disease control
Vaccination